Kerry Mayo (born 21 September 1977) is an English former professional footballer who played as a left back.

Career
Born in Haywards Heath, West Sussex, Mayo was a trainee with Brighton & Hove Albion and signed a professional contract with them in July 1996. On 6 May 2008, it was confirmed that Mayo, along with the experienced Guy Butters and Gary Hart, had been released from the club by then manager Dean Wilkins. However, after impressing during pre-season under new manager Micky Adams, Hart and Mayo signed new contracts.

In September 2008 Mayo joined Conference National team Lewes on loan for a month. He returned to Brighton on 10 October after suffering cruciate knee ligament damage.

Mayo left Brighton after his contract expired at the end of June 2009. He was one of the club's longest-serving players: during his 14-year career, he had played in 413 league and cup games and scored 14 goals. In July 2009, he announced his retirement from professional football after failing to recover from a groin injury.

On 18 November 2010, Mayo joined his local club, Newhaven, and scored on his debut in a 4–2 win over Pease Pottage.

References

External links

Kerry Mayo profile on Brighton & Hove Albion official website

1977 births
Living people
Footballers from West Sussex
People from Haywards Heath
English footballers
Association football defenders
Brighton & Hove Albion F.C. players
Lewes F.C. players
Newhaven F.C. players
English Football League players
National League (English football) players